Pepper Pot is a thick stew of beef tripe, vegetables, pepper and other seasonings. The soup was first made in West Africa and the Caribbean before being brought to North America through slave trade and made into a distinctively Philadelphian dish by colonial Black women in the 19th century. It was one of the first street foods, sold by so-called "Pepper Pot women", and was at one point the symbolic food of the city, much like the cheesesteak today.

History

Origin
Pepper Pot shares the same name as soups in the Caribbean but is credited specifically to Black Philadelphians. 

According to Catherine Clinton, "steaming peppery pot was served right on the street---a dish of vegetables, meat, and cassava, imported by West Indians". Historians suggest that the soup's origin can be traced from the West Indies to the Atlantic Coast of North America, following the path of slave trade.

There are many versions and variations of Peppery Pot stew, though many include dumplings. The traditional version associated with Philadelphia specifically do have some ingredients in common: "a variety of peppers, spices, root vegetables, beef tripe, herbs, and leafy greens." These ingredients came specifically from the Africans and Caribbeans living in the city at the time of its origin. Some chefs say that it's very similar to gumbo, but does not have okra. According to Jessica B. Harris, a renowned scholar on Black diasporic cuisines, they might share similarities because they "likely share the same food "ancestors,” like Senegalese soupe kandia and Beninese sauce feuille."

William Woys Weaver, a historian of Philadelphia-area food, has noted that versions of the dish in the city can be traced as far back as the 1600s. Back then the ingredient list looked a little different: "Black women would make stock, then cook turtles, fish, veal, collards, cassava, plantains, and spices together, often served with West African fufu or moussa dumplings."

The stew was known specifically for being sold on the street and "Pepper pot women" were among the Philadelphia's earliest street vendors, using 'street cries' to grab customer's attention. In a children's book from 1810 titled The Cries of Philadelphia, the scene is described in detail:"Strangers who visit the city, cannot but be amused with the cries of the numerous black women who sit in the market house and at the corners, selling a soup which they call pepperpot. It is made chiefly of tripe, ox-feet, and other cheap animal substances, with a portion of spice. It is sold very cheap, so that a hungry man may get a hearty meal for a few cents...and excepting to weak stomachs, it is a very pleasant feast."Even as the ingredients evolved over time, historians say that the inclusion of beef tripe is what makes the stew distinctively Philadelphia Pepper Pot. Other historians also say that a spicy capsicum pepper is another requirement; bell peppers would not have been used.

Revolutionary War myth 
The origins of the stew are steeped in legend, with one story attributing the dish to Christopher Ludwick, baker general of the Continental Army during the American Revolutionary War. According to this story, during the harsh winter of 1777–1778 farmers near Valley Forge sold food to the British rather than accepting the weak continental currency. The Continental Army survived on soup made of tripe, vegetables, and whatever else they could find. The story has been found to be almost certainly untrue, though it helped make the soup a symbol of the city.

In Philadelphia, legend made Pepper Pot soup popular and easy to find around the city.  It was sold as street food and in taverns because it was known as the stew which kept George Washington's troops alive during that cold winter. Its popularity meant that it became the symbolic food of the city, "It was a dish to try if you were an out-of-towner. It was a hangover cure. Diners treated the soup sort of how we treat cheesesteaks these days."

Contemporary
Once a popular staple of the city, Philadelphia Pepper Pot soup disappeared and became a rarity. A canned condensed Pepper Pot soup was available from the Campbell Soup Company for over 100 years, from 1899 until it was discontinued in 2010. A Campbell's representative gave "changing consumer tastes" as the reason for its demise. A lasting record of Pepper Pot's not-so-distant popularity, one of Andy Warhol's iconic Campbell Soup's works from 1962 features the Pepper Pot variety. It sold in 2006 for $12 million. In 1968, around when the painting was created, the Philadelphia chapter of the Public Relations Society of America chose the Pepper Pot as the symbol for its annual awards. By the 1990s, Pepper Pot was already losing popularity in restaurants and the home. The Campbell's soup was described as the canned version of "a street food that has retreated to the factory production line."

Although today it is difficult to find restaurants serving Philadelphia Pepper Pot soup, there are culinary historians in the United States working to restore its popularity. Noted Philadelphia chef Omar Tate, who focuses on black heritage cooking, added Pepper Pot to his restaurant's menu. He has noted the difficulty of bringing back a dish when there are so few people to ask if it tastes as they remember it.

Slang 
"Pepperpot" not only describes a stew, but according to a book from 1992, it is also a dialect synonym for hodgepodge or topsy-turvy in the Middle Atlantic states.

See also

 Cuisine of the Pennsylvania Dutch
 Cuisine of Philadelphia
 Guyana Pepperpot
 List of regional dishes of the United States
 List of stews

References

Bibliography

 

Pennsylvania Dutch cuisine
Cuisine of Philadelphia
Offal
American stews

African-American cuisine